Austropop is pop music from Austria, which came into use in the late 1960s, but had its heyday in the 1970s and early and up until the mid-1980s. Austropop comprises several musical styles, from traditional pop music to rock, and it also sometimes includes traditional folk elements such as yodeling.

Neue Deutsche Welle does not count as Austropop, as it was definitely German and the lyrics were in Standard German, while Austropop artists made a distinction by decidedly using Austrian dialects for their lyrics.

The movement is believed to have started in 1971 by Wolfgang Ambros with his song "Da Hofa", although this is debated. Ambros became famous, however, by translating songs by Bob Dylan into Austrian German, the most famous of which is "Naa, i bins ned", the translation of Dylan's "It Ain't Me Babe".

Austropop is still broadcast by various FM radio and TV stations throughout Austria and Bavaria, where they even have special nights replaying Austropop concerts.

Austrian music
Pop music by country